Jung Kil-Hwa is a male former international table tennis player from North Korea.

He won a bronze medal at the 1965 World Table Tennis Championships in the Swaythling Cup (men's team event) with Jung Ryang-Woong, Kim Chang-Ho, Kim Jung-Sam and Pak Sin Il.

He was world ranked 10 in the 1965 men's singles event but failed to progress to the round of 16.

See also
 List of table tennis players
 List of World Table Tennis Championships medalists

References

North Korean male table tennis players
World Table Tennis Championships medalists
20th-century North Korean people